Charles Crahay (born 9 November 1889, date of death unknown) was a Belgian fencer. He won a silver medal in the team foil competition at the 1924 Summer Olympics.

References

1889 births
Year of death missing
Belgian male fencers
Belgian foil fencers
Olympic fencers of Belgium
Fencers at the 1920 Summer Olympics
Fencers at the 1924 Summer Olympics
Fencers at the 1928 Summer Olympics
Olympic silver medalists for Belgium
Olympic medalists in fencing
Medalists at the 1924 Summer Olympics
20th-century Belgian people